Liz Vandall is a Swedish rock vocalist, and songwriter. She has recorded and performed as a member of the hard rock band Sahara, and recorded and toured extensively with Uli Jon Roth. A press release dated 7 April 2011 stated Vandall would be doing session work for the heavy metal opera project Lyraka.

Vandall lives in Germany with Roth, who is also her boyfriend. The two have a child, Akasha Dawn Roth.

Discography
With Sahara
   Going Crazy (1992)
   The Seventh House (1994)

With Uli Jon Roth
   Transcendental Sky Guitar (2000)
   Under a Dark Sky (2008)

With Lyraka
   Lyraka Volume 2 (2012)

With Amadeus Awad (Lebanese Guitarist)
   Time of The Equinox (2012)

References

External links
Official Site
Profile On Uli Jon Roth's Official Site
Sahara Profile on Metal Archives

Swedish women singers
Singers from Stockholm
Year of birth missing (living people)
Living people